This is a list of cities in Ivory Coast. Only the 40 most populous cities are listed here.

References

External links

 
Ivory Coast, List of cities in
Cities
Ivory Coast